Radha Cuadrado (born December 13, 1976), popularly known as RADHA, is a Filipino singer and songwriter best known as an original member of the Filipino-Canadian hip hop group Kulay (previously known as Boom). She was also part of the group 14-K. After leaving Kulay, Cuadrado pursued a solo career and performed in theater and lounge shows. She later starred in the TV series Diva on GMA 7. Most recently, she took part in the first season of The Voice of the Philippines.

Artistry

Cuadrado's influences include Aretha Franklin, Mary J. Blige, Stevie Wonder, Billie Holiday, Mariah Carey, Whitney Houston, Chaka Khan, Prince, and Al Green, and she frequently covers their songs in her shows. She started her singing career at the age of five. Radha has a dramatic coloratura mezzo-soprano vocal range.

Career
Cuadrado had several stints on television and stage, but her big break came at the age of fifteen, when she joined as lead singer of the hip hop group Kulay, which won many awards in the Philippines and went on an international tour all over the UK, Germany, Italy, and Denmark, putting them on the dance charts in the UK. In 1999, Pepsi Philippines launched the ad campaign "Ask for More" and chose Kulay to be their endorsers.

Cuadrado was also a member of the group 14-K with Jeffrey Hidalgo, Tony Lambino, and Tenten Muñoz.

In 2001, she embarked on a solo career. She has since written songs for other local artists as well as for her own repertoire. She also took part in the Himig Handog song contest's JAM: Himig Handog sa Makabagong Kabataan edition as an interpreter for the song entry "You Can Make It Happen", written by Dodjie Simon and Ellis Simon.

In 2013, Cuadrado successfully auditioned for the first season of The Voice of the Philippines and eventually advanced to the live shows, managing to reach the semi-finals.

Discography

With Kulay

References

Living people
Mezzo-sopranos
English-language singers from the Philippines
ABS-CBN personalities
Star Magic
1976 births
Singers from Manila
The Voice of the Philippines contestants
21st-century Filipino women singers